Dyspyralis illocata, the visitation moth, is moth in the family Erebidae. The family was first described by Warren in 1891. It is found in North America.

The MONA or Hodges number for Dyspyralis illocata is 8426.

References

Further reading

External links

 

Hypenodinae
Articles created by Qbugbot
Moths described in 1891